Hymenocallis speciosa, the green-tinge spiderlily, is a species of the genus Hymenocallis that is native to the Windward Islands in the eastern Caribbean. It is cultivated as an ornamental in some areas, and reportedly naturalized in Cuba and the Bahamas.

Hymenocallis speciosa is a bulb-forming perennial. Stipe can attain a height of up to 50 cm. Leaves are lanceolate, up to 50 cm long and 10 cm across, narrowing to a petiole below. One umbel can produce as many as 20 flowers. Flowers are white with a slight greenish tinge, the tepals reflexed (curling backwards) at flowering time.

References

speciosa
Flora of the Windward Islands
Flora of the Bahamas
Flora of Cuba
Plants described in 1794
Plants described in 1812
Flora without expected TNC conservation status